Mukesh Verma is an Indian politician and a member of 18th Uttar Pradesh Assembly and also 17th Legislative Assembly of Shikohabad (Assembly constituency), Uttar Pradesh of India. He represents the Firozabad, Ambedkar Nagar constituency of Uttar Pradesh and is a member of Samajwadi Party.

Political career
Verma has been a member of the 17th Legislative Assembly of Uttar Pradesh. Since 2017 he represents the Shikohabad constituency and was a member of the Bharatiya Janata Party.

He joined Samajwadi Party in 2022.

Posts held

See also
Uttar Pradesh Legislative Assembly

References

Uttar Pradesh MLAs 2017–2022
Samajwadi Party politicians from Uttar Pradesh
Living people
Dr. Bhimrao Ambedkar University alumni
Former members of Bharatiya Janata Party from Uttar Pradesh
Uttar Pradesh MLAs 2022–2027
1968 births